Mba Ernest Tchoupe Ndefotsing (born 22 November 1987) is a Cameroonian footballer.

Career
He began his career with Les Astres FC in Cameroon.

He signed with Coton Sport in 2006, where he won a championship in his debut season. The signing came with some controversy as he signed with the team while still under contract with Les Astres FC. Consequently, he was suspended for a year due to the improper signing procedure.

In 2008, he left his native Cameroon and moved to Colombia in Bogota as well as its inner suburbs, where he played for five years. He played three seasons in Categoría Primera B, the second division of Colombian soccer, seeing time in 2008 with Girardot FC, in 2009 with Alianza Petrolera and in 2010 with Expreso Rojo.

Ernest joined Minnesota Stars FC of the North American Soccer League in 2012. He made his debut on 5 May against the Atlanta Silverbacks as a substitute in the 22nd minute, scoring a goal two minutes later in the 24th minute. He returned to the team for the 2013 season.

In 2016, he joined FC Fargo in the amateur United States Adult Soccer Association.

In 2017, he joined CS St-Hubert of the Première Ligue de soccer du Québec. The following year, he moved to another PLSQ club, CS Fabrose. He was named one of the Players of the Week in the third week of the 2018 season. In 2021, he played two matches with CS Longueuil's reserve side in the PLSQ reserve division.

References

1987 births
Living people
Cameroonian footballers
Les Astres players
Cameroonian expatriate footballers
Alianza Petrolera players
Tigres F.C. footballers
Minnesota United FC (2010–2016) players
Expatriate footballers in Colombia
Expatriate soccer players in the United States
Expatriate soccer players in Canada
North American Soccer League players
Première ligue de soccer du Québec players
Association football defenders
CS St-Hubert players
CS Longueuil players
FC Laval players